Rosa Hasbún (born 21 May 1952) is a Salvadoran former swimmer. Born in Colombia, she competed in five events at the 1968 Summer Olympics.

References

1952 births
Living people
Salvadoran female swimmers
Olympic swimmers of El Salvador
Swimmers at the 1968 Summer Olympics
People from Valle del Cauca Department